The Yamalo-Nenets Autonomous Okrug (YaNAO; , ;) or Yamalia is a federal subject of Russia and an autonomous okrug of Tyumen Oblast. Its administrative center is the town of Salekhard, and its largest city is Noyabrsk. The 2010 Russian Census recorded its population as 522,904.

The autonomous okrug borders Krasnoyarsk Krai to the east, the Khanty-Mansi Autonomous Okrug to the south, and the Nenets Autonomous Okrug and Komi Republic to the west.

Geography and natural history

The West Siberian petroleum basin is the largest hydrocarbon (petroleum and natural gas) basin in the world covering an area of about 2.2 million km2, and is also the largest oil and gas producing region in Russia.

The Nenets people are an indigenous tribe who have long survived in this region. Their prehistoric life involved subsistence hunting and gathering, including the taking of polar bears; the practice of hunting polar bears (Ursus maritimus) continues up to the present time.

Yamalo-Nenets Autonomous Okrug is traversed by the northeasterly line of equal latitude and longitude, that is, at the point 70°N and 70°E, with equal degrees. The Polar Urals rise in the western part and the highest point of the okrug, as well as of the whole Ural mountain system, is Mount Payer.

The area consists of arctic tundra and taiga, with three large peninsulas - the Yamal Peninsula, Taz Peninsula and the Gyda Peninsula (itself containing the Yavay Peninsula and Mamonta Peninsula). There are nearly 300,000 lakes in the okrug, some of the main ones being Pyakuto, Chyortovo, Neito, Yambuto, Yarroto and Nembuto.

The Ob River flows through Yamalo-Nenets Autonomous Okrug to the Kara Sea via the Gulf of Ob, which dominates the geography of the Okrug (together with its two sub-bays, the Taz Estuary and Khalmyer Bay.

A number of islands are off the okrug's coast - from west to east, the main ones are Torasovey Island, Bolotnyy Island, Litke Island, Sharapovy Koshki Islands, Bely Island, Shokalsky Island, Petsovyye Islands, Proklyatyye Islands, Oleny Island, and Vilkitsky Island.

History
On December 10, 1930, Yamal (Nenets) National Okrug was formed based on Ural Oblast.

Administrative divisions

Demographics

Population: 

From 1960 to 2016, Yamal Nenets population increased from 60 000 people to more than 530 000 due to the natural resources discovered in the region. Currently, Yamal Nenets is the only Arctic Region in the Russian Federation that is not experiencing population decline. Despite the growing pressure on the regional environment, former governor Dmitry Kobylkin assured in 2016 that industrial developments are not affecting the traditional lifestyles of the native population. Official data accounts for an increment of 11 percent of the indigenous population from 2006 to 2016.

Vital statistics
Source: Russian Federal State Statistics Service

Regional demographics

Source

Ethnic groups
The Nenets make up 8.9% of the population, preceded by ethnic Russians (62.9%), and followed by Tatars (4.7%) and Ukrainians (4.5). Other prominent ethnic groups include Khanty (2.5%),  Azerbaijanis (1.7%), Bashkirs (1.5%), Kumyks (1.2%), and Nogais (0.9%) (all figures are from the 2021 Census). Due to the area's oil and natural gas wealth, it is one of the few places in Russia where the ethnic Russian population is growing.

Religion

According to a 2012 survey 42.2% of the population of Yamalia adhere to the Russian Orthodox Church, 14% are unaffiliated generic Christians, 1% are believers in Orthodox Christianity who do not belong to any church, 1% are members of the Slavic neopaganism (Rodnovery) or practitioners of local shamanic religions, and 1% are members of Protestant churches; Muslims, mostly Caucasian peoples and Tatars, make up 18% of the total population. In addition, 14% of the population declare to be "spiritual but not religious", 8% are atheist, and 0.8% follow other religions or did not give an answer to the question.

Economy

In 2009, Yamalo-Nenetsky Avtonomny Okrug is Russia's most important source of natural gas, with more than 90% of Russia's natural gas being produced there. The region also accounts for 12% of Russia's oil production. The region is the most important to Russia's largest company Gazprom, whose main production fields are located there. Novatek – the country's second-largest gas producer – is also active in the region, with its headquarters located in Tarko-Sale. According to Novatek on 22 October 2019, the natural gas reserves in the Yamalo-Nenets Autonomous Okrug represent 80% of Russia's natural gas and 15% of the world's natural gas supply.

Since the early 2010s Gazprom has been developing Yamal project in the Yamal Peninsula area. As of 2020, Yamal produces over 20% of Russia's gas, which is expected to increase to 40% by 2030. The shortest pipeline routes from Yamal to the northern EU countries are the Yamal–Europe pipeline through Poland and Nord Stream 1 to Germany. The proposed gas route from Western Siberia to China is known as Power of Siberia 2 pipeline.

United States sanctions beginning September 2019
Following the 14 September 2019 attack by Houthi movement on Saudi Arabian oil fields at Khurais and Abqaiq (Biqayq in Arabic) during the 2019–2021 Persian Gulf crisis, the United States imposed sanctions under Executive Order 13846 against several international companies, including Cosco Shipping Tanker (Dalian) Seaman and Ship Management Company Ltd and the Cosco Shipping Tanker Dalian (大連中遠海運油品運輸有限公司). Both of these are Cosco Shipping Company subsidiaries that support LNG shipments from Sabetta. 

Ships operated by these companies and their partnerships are directly affected by the sanctions. As of late September 2019, China LNG Shipping Ltd (CLNG) - a joint venture between the Cosco Shipping Tanker Dalian company and the Canadian firm Teekay - operates six of Sabetta's LNG ice fleet of 15 ARC7 LNG tankers, including: 
Eduard Toll
Rudolf Samoilovich
Nikolay Evgenov
Vladimir Voronin 
Georgy Ushakov (bound for Sabetta following sea trials)
Yakov Gakkel (currently undergoing sea trials in South Korea)

Also affected are five ARC7 tankers which supplied by Dynagas in a partnership between Sinotrans&CSC and CLNG, as well as three ARC7 tankers from a joint venture between the Cosco subsidiary Shanghai LNG and Japan's MOL (株式会社商船三井). While these ARC7 tankers are not directly sanctioned by the United States, US Office of Foreign Assets Control (OFAC) rules require caution to be exercised when dealing with these related companies. Of the fifteen ARC7 tankers operating out of Sabetta, only Sovcomflot's Christophe de Margerie is not affected by the sanctions.

Service for these ships was previously provided at Honningsvåg, Norway, but this will be phased out and future LNG tanker shipments in the Northern Sea Route are expected to occur between Murmansk and Kamchatka, remaining in Russia coastal waters. On 30 January 2020, the United States lifted sanctions on Cosco Shipping Tanker (Dalian) and its TC LNG .

Notable people
 Anastasia Lapsui (b. 1944), Nenets film director, screenwriter, radio journalist

See also

List of chairmen of the Legislative Assembly of Yamalo-Nenets Autonomous Okrug

References

Sources

External links

 Informational website of Yamalo-Nenets Autonomous Okrug

 
Autonomous okrugs of Russia
Ural Federal District
Kara Sea
Autonomous okrugs of the Soviet Union
1930 establishments in the Soviet Union
Russian-speaking countries and territories
States and territories established in 1930